Painted Ladies, first published in 2010, is the 39th book in Robert B. Parker's  Spenser series.

Spenser investigates the theft of a famous painting from the Hammond Museum.

References

Spenser (novel series)
2010 American novels
American detective novels
G. P. Putnam's Sons books